Regresa (Spanish "Come Back") may refer to:

Regresa (film), Mexican film 2010
Regresa, album by Mexican singer Chantal Andere 1990
Regresa, album by Dominican singer Alberto Beltrán 1960
Regresa, album by Peruvian band Los Violines de Lima 1970
Regresa, album by Bolivian band Los Ronisch 1999
"Regresa", song written by Rafael Pérez Botija, single for Chantal Andere 1990 
"Regresa", song written by Augusto Polo Campos, a number one hit internationally for Lucha Reyes
"Regresa", song written by Guadalupe Guevara, from Grupo Bryndis album Historia Musical Romántica

See also
"Regresa a mí" (Thalía song)
"Regresa a mí" (Il Divo song)
"Regresa a mí" (Toni Braxton song)